Krok Island is an irregular-shaped island nearly  in extent, the largest of the group lying  south of Abrupt Island and  west of Hoseason Glacier, Antarctica. It was mapped by Norwegian cartographers from aerial photos taken by the Lars Christensen Expedition, 1936–37, and named "Krokoy" (crooked island).

See also 
 List of Antarctic and sub-Antarctic islands

References

Islands of Kemp Land